Imperial Army of the Holy Roman Empire may refer to

Imperial Army (Holy Roman Empire), controlled by the Holy Roman Emperors, in German Kaiserliche Armee
Army of the Holy Roman Empire, deployed by the Imperial Diet, in German Reichsarmee, Reichsheer or Reichsarmatur, from 1422 to 1806